Makaya (or Makhaya) Ntshoko (born 29 October 1939, Cape Town) is a South African drummer.

He played with Dollar Brand's trio in 1958, and recorded in a sextet with Hugh Masekela and John Mehegan in 1959. He performed on The Jazz Epistles album, Jazz Epistle: Verse 1. After the breakup of the group, Ntshoko founded The Jazz Giants with Kippie Moeketsi, Dudu Pukwana, Gideon Nxumalo, and Martin Mgijima. Ntshoko left South Africa in 1962, moving to Switzerland and playing with Johnny Gertze and Dollar Brand at the Club Africana in Zurich from 1963 to 1965.

Following Brand's move to New York City, Ntshoko played in Copenhagen (1966, 1969–70) and recorded with Stuff Smith (1967), Benny Bailey (1968), Dexter Gordon (1968–69), and Ben Webster (1969). He embarked on a tour of the United States and the Bahamas in the early 1970s. He and Masekela recorded again in 1972. In 1974 he founded Makaya and the Tsotsis with Heinz Sauer, Bob Degen, and Isla Eckinger (later replaced by Jürgen Wuchner). Concomitantly he played in Nicra with Nick Evans and Radu Malfatti. In 1975, he appeared alongside Joe McPhee and Pepper Adams at the Willisau Jazz Festival. He collaborated with Mal Waldron (1977–79) and Johnny Dyani (1978).

Discography

As leader or co-leader
 Makaya & the Tsotsis with Heinz Sauer, Bob Degen, Isla Eckinger (Enja, 1974)
 Happy House (SteepleChase, 2008)

As sideman
With Pepper Adams
 Twelfth & Pingree (Enja, 1975)
 Julian (Enja, 1976)

With Dollar Brand
 Duke Ellington Presents the Dollar Brand (Reprise, 1961)
 Dollar Brand Plays Sphere Jazz (Continental, 1962)
 Anatomy of a South African Village (Fontana, 1965)
 The Dream Trio (Freedom, 1979)
 Round Midnight at the Montmartre (Black Lion, 1988)
 Blues for a Hip King (Kaz, 1988)

With Johnny Dyani
 Song for Biko (SteepleChase, 1979)
 Grand Mother's Teaching (Disques Jam, 1982)

With Hugh Masekela
 Home Is Where the Music Is (Blue Thumb, 1972)
 The African Connection (MCA, 1980)

With Joe McPhee
 The Willisau Concert (Hat Hut, 1976)
 Tenor (Hat Hut, 1977)

With Marvin Peterson 
 In Antibes (Enja, 1977)
 Tribute (Baystate, 1979)

With Mal Waldron
 One-Upmanship (Enja, 1977)
 Moods (Enja, 1978)

With Ben Webster
 Ben Webster Plays Ballads (Storyville, 1988)
 Plays Duke Ellington (Storyville, 1988)

With others
 Benny Bailey, Soul Eyes (SABA, 1968)
 Sathima Bea Benjamin, A Morning in Paris (Enja, 1997)
 Bob Degen, Sequoia Song (Enja, 1976)
 Dexter Gordon, Stella by Starlight  (SteepleChase, 2005)
 Keith Jarrett, Charles Lloyd, Dollar Brand, Michael White, Europa Jazz (Europa Jazz, 1981)
 Jazz Epistles, Jazz Epistle Verse 1 (Continental, 1960)
 Gideon Nxumalo, Jazz Fantasia (Renown, 1962)
 Stuff Smith, Hot Violins (Storyville, 1991)
 John Tchicai, Irene Schweizer, Willi the Pig: Live at the Willisau Jazz Festival (Willisau Live, 1976)

References

Lars Rasmussen, "Makaya Ntshoko". Grove Dictionary of Jazz online.

1939 births
Living people
Musicians from Cape Town
South African drummers
Male drummers
20th-century drummers
20th-century male musicians
The Jazz Epistles members